Rollingergrund is an area of north-western Luxembourg City, in southern Luxembourg.  It forms the majority of the quarter of Rollingergrund-North Belair.

Rollingergrund was a commune in the canton of Luxembourg between 8 May 1849, when it was split from the commune of Eich, and 26 March 1920, when it was merged into the city of Luxembourg, along with Hamm and Hollerich.

Michel Engels (1851–1901), the celebrated illustrator, author and art teacher, was born in Rollingergrund.

Footnotes

Former communes of Luxembourg
Neighbourhoods of Luxembourg City